The Lyrics Board was an Irish game show hosted by Aonghus McAnally and then by Eurovision Song Contest 1992 winner Linda Martin. In each episode there are two teams. Each team consists of a piano player/team captain who is joined by two celebrities/singers, at either side. A team would choose a number from one to five, from "the board", revealing a word. The team would then have to sing a song with that related word to remain in charge of 'the board'. If the team sing the secret song which is on the board, then this team would win a point, with the team with the most points declared as the winners.

Team captains on the show included former Eurovision winner Paul Harrington, Kyron & The Strangels frontman Kyron Bourke, You're A Star Musical Director Ronan Johnston and Jim Sheridan, keyboard player with the Camembert Quartet.  26 different versions have been produced worldwide.

The format was revamped for the 2011–2012 season by RTÉ for its TRTÉ strand. The new version of the format was called Sing! and was presented by former Pop Idol contestant Brian Ormond with former Six member Emma O'Driscoll and Royseven frontman Paul Walsh acting as team captains.

All programmes of it online on RTE Player Christmas 2021 to celebrate 60 years of television.

International versions

See also
 Don't Forget the Lyrics! another lyrics-themed game show
 The Singing Bee (American game show) another lyrics-themed game show

References

External links
The Lyrics Board @ pearsontv

Irish game shows
Irish variety television shows
1990s game shows
2000s game shows
2010s game shows